John Codrington Warwick Bampfylde or Bampfield (27 August 1754 – 1796/7) was an 18th-century English poet. He came from a prominent Devon family, his father being Sir Richard Bampfylde, 4th Baronet, and was educated at Trinity Hall, Cambridge. He had financial problems, having fallen into dissipation on going to London. His romantic advances to Mary Palmer (later wife of Murrough O'Brien, 1st Marquess of Thomond), niece of Joshua Reynolds, were refused by her and discouraged by Reynolds, who expelled Bampfylde from the house. Bampfylde was subsequently arrested for breaking Reynolds's windows, and he spent the latter part of his life in a psychiatric hospital in London, briefly regaining his sanity before his death. He died of tuberculosis.

His only published work was Sixteen Sonnets (1778), which attracted the attention of Robert Southey.

References

Leslie Stephen, "Bampfylde, John Codrington Warwick (1754–1796)", rev. S. C. Bushell, Oxford Dictionary of National Biography, Oxford University Press, 2004, http://www.oxforddnb.com/view/article/1262, retrieved 25 June 2007.

External links
John Codrington Bampfylde
 National Portrait Gallery: John Codrington Bampfylde (1754-1796), Poet
 
 

1754 births
1796 deaths
18th-century deaths from tuberculosis
18th-century English poets
Tuberculosis deaths in England
Younger sons of baronets
English male poets
18th-century English male writers
18th-century English writers
Sonneteers